Adriano Panatta defeated Harold Solomon in the final, 6–1, 6–4, 4–6, 7–6(7–3) to win the men's singles tennis title at the 1976 French Open. Panatta became the first man in the Open Era to win the French Open after saving a match point en route, doing so against Pavel Huťka in the first round.

Björn Borg was the two-time defending champion, but lost in the quarterfinals to Panatta.

Seeds
The seeded players are listed below. Adriano Panatta is the champion; others show the round in which they were eliminated.

  Björn Borg (quarterfinals)
  Guillermo Vilas (quarterfinals)
  Manuel Orantes (quarterfinals)
  Arthur Ashe (fourth round)
  Raúl Ramírez (semifinals)
  Eddie Dibbs (semifinals)
  Harold Solomon (final)
  Adriano Panatta (champion)
 n/a
  Brian Gottfried (fourth round)
  Wojtek Fibak (fourth round)
  John Newcombe (first round)
  Jan Kodeš (third round)
  Jaime Fillol Sr. (fourth round)
  Corrado Barazzutti (fourth round)
  François Jauffret (fourth round)

Draw

Key
 Q = Qualifier
 WC = Wild card
 LL = Lucky loser
 r = Retired

Finals

Section 1

Section 2

Section 3

Section 4

Section 5

Section 6

Section 7

Section 8

External links
 Association of Tennis Professionals (ATP) – 1976 French Open Men's Singles draw
1976 French Open – Men's draws and results at the International Tennis Federation

Men's Singles
French Open by year – Men's singles
1976 Grand Prix (tennis)